Soccoh Kabia is a Sierra Leonean politician and physician who served as the Minister of Health, Minister of Social Welfare, Gender and Children's Affairs, and Minister of Fisheries and Marine Resources of Sierra Leone from 2007 to 2013.

Early life and education
Kabia was born in Bo, Sierra Leone. His father is Paramount Chief Bai Koblo Pathbana II, an ethnic Temne from Lunsar, Port Loko District and his mother is Paramount Chief Madam Ella Koblo Gulama, an ethnic Mende. His parents ruled the two most influential royal houses in Sierra Leone. Between them, his parents ruled the two most important royal houses in Sierra Leone. His mother is widely considered the country's greatest stateswomen.

He is the younger brother of Francis Obai Kabia.

Kabia is a physician and nephrologist.

Political career
He is currently the only member of the People's Movement for Democratic Change (PMDC) political party in the current cabinet of Ernest Bai Koroma.

Kabia attended medical school in the United States. He spent over thirty years as a medical doctor in the United States.

Ancestry

Further reading
 Bai Koblo Pathbana II
 Ella Koblo Gulama
 Francis Obai Kabia
 Julius Gulama
 David Lansana

External links
http://www.afdevinfo.com/htmlreports/peo/peo_41385.aspx

References 

African royalty
Government ministers of Sierra Leone
Living people
People's Movement for Democratic Change politicians
People from Bo, Sierra Leone
Sierra Leonean nobility
Sierra Leonean royalty
Temne people
Year of birth missing (living people)